Akzhaik is a village under the administrative jurisdiction of the city of Atyrau in the Atyrau Region, Kazakhstan. Population: .

References 

Populated places in Atyrau Region